Bathow Puja is an important religious festival of the Bodo-Kacharies of  Assam, India. In this festival, the people worship a god known by different names like Gila Damra, Khuria Bwrai, Sri Brai (Shib bwrai), Bathow Bwrai etc. The different forms of this festival are-Garja, Kherai and Marai. Among these festivals Kherai is the most significant.

Kherai Puja

Before this festival the religious rites of the Garja are performed and consequently a date
is fixed by the Bodo villagers for performing the Kherai Puja. In kherai Puja, a cactus called Bwrai Bathow 
surrounded by a small bamboo boundary is offered flowers, fruits and some grains. Different leaves like special grass, mango leaves and tulsi leaves dipped in a small pot with water is also kept nearby. The incense and Dhuna (coconut peel burnt in a small holder) keep on burning arousing nice fragrance. In this puja, Doudini, the oracle possessed  by the Gods plays the main role. The dodini enchanted with mantras by the Deuri (priest) performs the Kherai dance in front of the cactus called Bwrai Bathow. She is accompanied by music played by men at a distance. The beat of the music has to follow the exact rhythm as taught by the Doudini beforehand.

References

External links
 
 ‘Kherai a religious festival’, assamtribune.com.

Bodo
Festivals in Assam
Religious festivals in India